Sugar for the Soul is the fifth studio album recorded by Sexepil. The album was recorded by Brian Anderson at the Phoenix Studio in Budapest, Hungary. The album was produced by Brian Anderson and Sexepil, and it was mixed Brian Anderson and engineered by Mark Haines at Butch Vig and Steve Marker's Smart Studios in Madison, Wisconsin, The United States. The record was mastered by Howie Weinberg at Masterdisk in New York City, The United States. All songs were written by Sexepil and all lyrics by Mick Ness. The album was released by Magneoton and Warner Music Hungary, Warner Music Group in Hungary.

Track listing

Personnel
The following people contributed to Sugar for the Soul:

Sexepil
 László Viktor - bass
 Tibor Vangel - drums
 Tamás Kocsis - guitars
 Mick Ness - vocals 
 Gábor Varga - keyboards

Additional musicians and production
 Brian Anderson - recording and mixing
 Béla Jánosi - engineering
 Howie Weinberg - mastering
 Miklós Déri - cover photo

References

External links
 Sugar for the Soul at Allmusic Hungary's webpage
 Sugar for the Soul at Dalok
 Sugar for the Soul at YouTube

1995 albums
Sexepil albums